Doug Robertson was a Scottish footballer who broke through into the senior ranks with Dumbarton in the late 1950s.  After signing up in August 1959, he had over 100 appearances for Dumbarton before being released in April 1966.

References

Scottish footballers
Dumbarton F.C. players
Scottish Football League players
Year of birth missing
Place of birth missing
Association football goalkeepers
Drumchapel Amateur F.C. players